The Fort of Budhayan is a location in the war of the Indian Rebellion of 1857.

References

Forts in India
Indian Rebellion of 1857